Lisa Lillien (born December 31, 1965) is an American entrepreneur. She is the creator of the Hungry Girl brand, including email-subscription, cookbooks, low-calorie recipes, and life-hacks.

Background
Lillien's roots are in magazines and, more generally, entertainment. She grew up on Long Island and identifies as Jewish ("a nice Jewish girl from Long Island"). She graduated from Lawrence High School in 1983. She does not have a degree in nutrition, but uses the neologism foodologist due to obsession with food. She received a B.A. in communication from University at Albany, SUNY in 1987. Directly from college she became editor-in-chief at Tutti Frutti (teen-fan magazine, Jimmijack Publishing, 1987–1991).

Career

Business
For five years, Lillien was online executive producer for TV Land and director of convergence development at Nickelodeon online. Next she was a producer for new media at Telepictures (Warner Bros.).
She quit her job and started the Hungry Girl brand in 2004, with a weekly email (originally Tips and Tricks ... for Hungry Chicks). She has averaged over one million subscribers. The content consists mainly of recipes and life-hacks, written in a pink, exclamation-point, LOL style; or as Lillien once put it, "getting excited over silly things [...] When I launched Hungry Girl, I wanted it to be the same...writing style[:] conversational and excited, [like] writing about teen stars, and pop stars...".

Regular advertisers across media have included Weight Watchers, Dreyers light ice cream, and General Mills, later including Green Giant, Quaker, The Laughing Cow cheeses, and Beyond Better Foods.

Media
As a writer, Lillien has had a weekly column on the Weight Watchers website and has written for Redbook magazine. She has appeared on cooking shows like Rachael Ray.

In 2011 and 2012, Triage Entertainment produced 36 episodes of a Hungry Girl program; they aired on Cooking Channel and Food Network. The recipes of the 2012 season remain online.

The Meredith Corporation began a quarterly Hungry Girl magazine in 2018.

Personal life
In 2002, Lillien married writer/producer Dan Schneider. They have a dog named Lolly, and live in Encino, California.

Books
Hungry Girl Clean & Hungry: Easy All-Natural Recipes for Healthy Eating in the Real World (April 5, 2016)
The Hungry Girl Diet Cookbook: Healthy Recipes for Mix-n-Match Meals & Snacks (December 29, 2015)
The Hungry Girl Diet: Big Portions. Big Results. Drop 10 Pounds in 4 Weeks (March 25, 2014)
Hungry Girl 200 Under 200 Just Desserts: 200 Recipes Under 200 Calories (May 7, 2013)
Hungry Girl to the Max!: The Ultimate Guilt-Free Cookbook (October 16, 2012)
By Lisa Lillien – Hungry Girl 300 Under 300: 300 Breakfast, Lunch & Dinner Dishes Under 300 Calories (February 27, 2011)
Hungry Girl 300 Under 300: 300 Breakfast, Lunch & Dinner Dishes Under 300 Calories (March 29, 2011)
Hungry Girl Supermarket Survival: Aisle by Aisle, HG-Style! (October 11, 2011)
Hungry Girl 1-2-3: The Easiest, Most Delicious, Guilt-Free Recipes on the Planet (March 30, 2010)
Hungry Girl Happy Hour: 75 Recipes for Amazingly Fantastic Guilt-Free Cocktails and Party Foods (June 22, 2010)
Hungry Girl: 200 Under 200: 200 Recipes Under 200 Calories (April 14, 2009)
Hungry Girl: The Official Survival Guides (April 14, 2009)
Hungry Girl Chew the Right Thing: Supreme Makeovers for 50 Foods You Crave (December 8, 2009)
Hungry Girl: Recipes and Survival Strategies for Guilt-Free Eating in the Real World (April 29, 2008)

References

External links

1965 births
American cookbook writers
American women non-fiction writers
Living people
Place of birth missing (living people)
Women cookbook writers
21st-century American women
University at Albany, SUNY alumni